Trouballs is a 2001 Game Boy Color game developed by Paragon Five and published by Capcom Entertainment, and is a puzzle game similar in design to Tetris and Puyo Puyo.

Gameplay

 

Trouballs requires players to match balls of the same color into boxes of four or six, which then disappear. Players manipulate the balls on the screen through turning wheels. Additional features include falling balls, moving winches and gears. The game has two modes: a "set number" mode that has a set number of balls on the screen, that requires the player to arrange the balls in rectangles of four or six balls until they vanish, or "ever more balls", in which balls keep falling into play, and keep the play screen from filling up with balls until the time limit.

Reception

Trouballs received mixed reviews. Positive reviews, such as Ian Osborne of Game Boy Xtreme, stated the game was a "fun game" and "solid, playable puzzler". Craig Harris of IGN praised Trouballs as "decent package with a lot of decent puzzles to complete". Negative reviews of Trouballs focused on the unremarkable design and presentation. GamePro critiqued the depth of Trouballs, stating "the presentation isn't very interesting with Tetris-style backdrops and monotonous music that don't really keep you involved...it doesn't deliver long hours of fun gameplay like the rest of its genre." Allgame stated "the time limit means you have to rush to finish a level, which leads to sloppiness, which means you have to restart often...once you run out of lives, you have to start back at the first level...what it all adds up to is that it'll probably take a player over half an hour of starting and restarting just to get past the second level."

References

External links

2001 video games
Capcom games
Falling block puzzle games
Game Boy Color games
Game Boy Color-only games
Puzzle video games
Single-player video games
Paragon Five games